The yellow-green grosbeak (Caryothraustes canadensis) is a species of grosbeak in the family Cardinalidae.

Taxonomy
In 1760 the French zoologist Mathurin Jacques Brisson included a description of the yellow-green grosbeak in his Ornithologie based on a specimen collected in Cayenne in French Guiana. He used the French name Le Gros-bec de Cayenne and the Latin name Coccothraustes Cayanensis. Although Brisson coined Latin names, these do not conform to the binomial system and are not recognised by the International Commission on Zoological Nomenclature. When in 1766 the Swedish naturalist Carl Linnaeus updated his Systema Naturae for the twelfth edition he added 240 species that had been previously described by Brisson. One of these was the yellow-green grosbeak. Linnaeus included a terse description, used the binomial name Loxia canadensis and cited Brisson's work. Linnaeus mistakenly claimed that the species occurred in Canada rather than Cayenne and introduced the specific name canadensis for Canada where the bird does not occur. This species is now placed in the genus Caryothraustes that was introduced by the German naturalist Ludwig Reichenbach in 1850. There are four subspecies.

Distribution and habitat
It is found in Brazil, Colombia, French Guiana, Guyana, Panama, Suriname, and Venezuela.
Its natural habitats are subtropical or tropical moist lowland forest and heavily degraded former forest.

References

yellow-green grosbeak
Birds of the Guianas
Birds of the Amazon Basin
Birds of the Venezuelan Amazon
Birds of Brazil
Birds of the Atlantic Forest
yellow-green grosbeak
yellow-green grosbeak
Taxonomy articles created by Polbot